Joshua Frederick Thomas (born 11 January 2005) is an English cricketer. He made his List A debut on 14 August 2022, for Somerset in the 2022 Royal London One-Day Cup.

References

External links
 

2005 births
Living people
English cricketers
Somerset cricketers
People educated at King's College, Taunton
Place of birth missing (living people)